Vanthali is a city and a municipality in Junagadh district in the Indian state of Gujarat.

Demographics
 India census, Vanthali had a population of 21,891. Males constitute 53% of the population and females 47%. Vanthali has an average literacy rate of 70%, higher than the national average of 59.5%: male literacy is 77%, and female literacy is 61%.

History 

Vanthali officially Vamansthali Now is a small town in Junagadh district in the Indian State of Gujarat. There are traces that this place was inhabited many many centuries back. It was called "Vamanasthali" or "wamansthali" in ancient days.

After the destruction of Maitraka dynasty of Saurashtra, Sorath area became independent. During this time the Vamansthali area was ruled by Walaram, a Chavda Rajput king. Raja Wala Ram had no sons, and the question arose as to who should succeed him after his death. It happened that among the Hindu tribes which had migrated Southward before the encroachments of the Mahomedans was that of the Samas, who settled at Saminagar (now Nagar Thatha), in Sindh. Wala Ram's sister had been married to the chief of the Samma tribe, and her son, Ra Chuda, was selected to follow his uncle at Wamansthali.

Accordingly, at Wala Ram's death, in about A.D. 875, Ra Chuda founded the Chudasama dynasty, adding the name of his father's tribe to his own name. The Chudasama quickly became very powerful, and from an inscription at Dhandhusar we learn that the rulers of all neighbouring countries regarded them as paramount. The dynasty continued to hold sway from 875 A.D. to 1473 A.D. nearly six hundred years. Having capital Vamansthali and Junagadh alternatively.

Places of interest

Ra Khengar stepwell is a 13th-century stepwell located near Koyliphatak village near Vanthali. It is constructed in the Ghatapallava style. It had pillars surrounding it and possibly had three cupolas near it.

References

Cities and towns in Junagadh district